Zodarion pacificum is a spider species found in Croatia and Bosnia.

See also 
 List of Zodariidae species

References

External links 

pacificum
Spiders described in 2009
Spiders of Europe
Fauna of Croatia